Herfordia may refer to:

 10669 Herfordia, a main-belt asteroid discovered on March 16, 1977
 Herfordia (beetle), a beetle genus in the subfamily Latridiinae

See also
 Herford (disambiguation)